The European Jewish Fund (EJF) is an international non-governmental organisation that coordinates and supports programmes and events aimed at improving interreligious and interethnic relations, reinforcing Jewish identity, counteracting assimilation, promoting tolerance and reconciliation in Europe, fighting against xenophobia, extremism and antisemitism, and preserving the memory of the Holocaust. The EJF was established in 2006 on the initiative of Viatcheslav Moshe Kantor, who is President of the European Jewish Congress and EJF Chairman. Ariella Woitchik is EJF Secretary General.

The Fund's governing body is Advisory Council, which consists of representatives from European Jewish communities.

The EJF implements local, regional and pan-European projects initiated by both individual communities and the Fund itself. The EJF’s main goal is to strengthen Jewish identity and bringing Jewish communities together. Its activities develop national pride and reinforce Jewish pride within communities. The EJF highlights and celebrates Jews and their remarkable contributions to European and global society and culture.

The Fund also implements large-scale programmes aimed at disseminating tolerance on the European continent, strengthening mutual respect among representatives of all nationalities and faiths, reinforcing Jews’ cultural pride and counteracting assimilation. The EJF actively fights xenophobia, antisemitism and racial discrimination and develops proposals and recommendations on reinforcing the fight against these negative phenomena of the modern world. It is also committed to promoting educational programmes that ensure the lessons and memory of the Holocaust live on.

Projects
The Fund’s activities fall into several categories: education and leadership; culture and heritage; community building; Shoah memory.

One of the EJF’s founders, the World Holocaust Forum Foundation, holds together with the European Jewish Congress the “Let My People Live!” international forums. To date four of these forums have been held, the last two in cooperation with the President of the European Parliament:

January 2005 – The first forum, in Krakow, commemorating the 60th anniversary of the liberation of Auschwitz-Birkenau.
September 2006 – The second forum, in Kiev, marked 65 years since the atrocity in Babi Yar.
January 2010 – The third forum, in Krakow, commemorating the 65th anniversary of the liberation of Auschwitz-Birkenau.
January 2015 – The fourth forum took place in Prague and Terezin, commemorating the 70th anniversary since the liberation of concentration and death camps.

The EJF helps organise these high-level international gatherings to preserving historical memory and evidence, and encourage the international community to unite in the fight against hatred and xenophobia.

Other EJC activities are:

Publicising the achievements of outstanding individuals of Jewish origin: in order to reduce the level of antisemitism, xenophobia and nationalism in Europe. The EJF supports the Museum of Avant-Garde Mastery, containing a collection of works by famous Russian artists of Jewish origin including Valentin Serov, Léon Bakst, Marc Chagall, El Lissitzky and Chaïm Soutine.
Promoting nuclear non-proliferation and preventing a nuclear holocaust: The EJF supports the activities of the International Luxembourg Forum on Preventing Nuclear Catastrophe, which consists of prominent political and public figures, diplomats and nuclear experts. The EJF’s leadership believes that the Iranian nuclear programme is one of the major threats to global security today.
Providing a platform for reinforcing relations between European Jewish communities: Annual EJF Advisory Council meetings foster dialogue between Jewish communities, with open exchanges of experience that produce cooperative solutions to shared challenges.

The Fund actively participated in the organisation of the European Week of Tolerance, held in large European cities on November 9–16, 2008. This series of events marked both the International Day for Tolerance and the 70th anniversary of die Kristallnacht. Within the framework of the European Week of Tolerance, prominent leaders, business people and scholars came together for a series of meetings. The European Parliament and the Parliamentary Assembly of the Council of Europe were presented with the draft European Framework Convention on Promoting Tolerance and Combating Intolerance and the Concept for a White Paper on Tolerance.

See also
European Jewish Congress
International Luxembourg Forum on Preventing Nuclear Catastrophe
World Holocaust Forum
Museum of Avant-Garde Mastery
Viatcheslav Moshe Kantor

References

External links
European Jewish Fund
International Luxembourg Forum on Preventing Nuclear Catastrophe
World Holocaust Forum
European Jewish Congress
Viatcheslav Moshe Kantor (website)

International Jewish organizations
Anti-racism in Europe
Jews and Judaism in Europe
Jewish organizations based in Europe
Jewish organizations based in Israel